(On the figures of Venus) is an anthology of ancient Greek and ancient Roman writings on erotic topics, discussed objectively and classified and grouped by subject matter. It was first published by the German classicist Friedrich Karl Forberg in 1824 in Latin and Greek as a commentary to Antonio Beccadelli's (1394–1471)  (commonly referred to as ), an erotic poem sequence of 1425 in Renaissance Latin, though it was later also published as a separate work. 

Forberg's work was later also translated into English in 1899 and published by Charles Carrington as De figuris Veneris, Manual of classical erotology, and again in 1907 by Charles Hirsch, and into French, German and Spanish. The French edition by Alcide Bonneau was titled . One French edition of 1906 was illustrated by Édouard-Henri Avril, which concludes with a list of 95 sexual positions. The Spanish translation was titled .

In popular culture
In Robert A. Heinlein's last novel, To Sail Beyond the Sunset (1987), Dr Ira Johnson uses the book for sexual education. Later, Maureen Johnson does the same.

References and sources

Bibliography
 Manuel d'erotologie classique; artandpopularculture.com
 Antonii Panormitae Hermaphroditus, Friedrich Karl Forberg (a cura di), Goburgi, sumtibus Meuseliorum, 1824, pp. 205 ff.
 Manual of classical erotology (de figuris Veneris), Manchester, Julian Smithson M. A. and friends, 1884.

External links

1824 non-fiction books
Sexuality in classical antiquity
Erotic literature
19th-century Latin books